Nevada Capitol Police is a division of the Nevada Department of Public Safety that is responsible for law enforcement in major state buildings within Nevada. It also provides security for the senior government officials.

The Nevada Capitol Police was organized in the late 1940s as the security detail of the Nevada Division of Buildings and Grounds, with one night watchman patrolling the perimeter of the Nevada State Capitol Complex (including the Governor's Mansion), using any available Buildings and Grounds vehicle to deter crime, sometimes with the assistance of the then-Ormsby County Sheriff and Carson City Police Departments.

In 1966, the night watch crew had grown to three officers, and the department was renamed "Capitol Security". In 1972, the Nevada Legislature reorganized its status as "limited peace officers", meaning that they were not recognized as fully sworn peace officers under the Nevada Revised Statutes at the time. In 1985, this status was elevated to "official sworn peace officer", meaning that they were now in the same league as the Nevada Highway Patrol, Las Vegas Metropolitan Police Department, Reno Police and the reorganized Carson City Sheriff's Office.

There have been eight Chiefs of the Nevada Capitol Police since its current status was established in 1985. Brad Valladon was the Chief from November 2001. He was succeeded by Pat Conmay in June 2009, Jay Logue in January 2010, Thomas Navin in 2012 and the current Chief, Jerome Tushbant, in March 2013.

At the time of its 1985 reorganization, there were only eight officers statewide; currently, there are 27: nineteen in the Carson City Command, the remaining eight assigned to the Las Vegas Command (serving the Las Vegas Valley).

Commands 

Capitol Police - Carson City
Capitol Police - Las Vegas

See also 

 List of law enforcement agencies in Nevada
 Capitol police

External links 
Nevada Capitol Police

State law enforcement agencies of Nevada
Specialist police departments of Nevada
Capitol police
Organizations based in Carson City, Nevada